The 2020 Tirreno–Adriatico was a road cycling stage race that was originally scheduled to take place between 11 and 17 March 2020 in Italy. On 6 March 2020, it was postponed due to COVID-19 concerns in Italy and rescheduled to 7 to 14 September. It was the 55th edition of Tirreno–Adriatico and part of the 2020 UCI World Tour.

Teams
All nineteen UCI WorldTeams and six wildcard UCI ProTeams made up the twenty-four teams that participated in the race. Each team entered seven riders, making up a starting peloton of 175 riders. Of these riders, 152 finished the race.

UCI WorldTeams

 
 
 
 
 
 
 
 
 
 
 
 
 
 
 
 
 
 
 

UCI ProTeams

Route

Stages

Stage 1
7 September 2020 — Lido di Camaiore to Lido di Camaiore,

Stage 2
8 September 2020 — Camaiore to Follonica,

Stage 3
9 September 2020 — Follonica to Saturnia,

Stage 4
10 September 2020 — Terni to Cascia,

Stage 5 
11 September 2020 — Norcia to Sassotetto,

Stage 6
12 September 2020 — Castelfidardo to Senigallia,

Stage 7
13 September 2020 — Pieve Torina to Loreto,

Stage 8
14 September 2020 — San Benedetto del Tronto to San Benedetto del Tronto, individual time trial (ITT)

Classification leadership table

Final classification standings

General classification

Points classification

Mountains classification

Young rider classification

Teams classification

References

2020
2020 UCI World Tour
2020 in Italian sport
September 2020 sports events in Italy
Cycling events postponed due to the COVID-19 pandemic